Raphaël Calvet (born 7 February 1994) is a French professional footballer who plays as a defender for club Martigues. He is a product of the Auxerre youth system and represented France at youth level.

Club career

Auxerre
After beginning his youth career with CAV St. Georges, Calvet joined his hometown club AJ Auxerre in 2004, and progressed through the youth teams. He made his debut for the club's reserve team in the Championnat de France amateur at the end of the 2010–11 season. Calvet made his first team debut in a 1–1 Ligue 2 draw at Châteauroux in November 2012, starting the match and playing the full 90 minutes. He was an unused substitute on a further three occasions during Auxerre's 2012–13 campaign. Following a meniscus tear and the arrival of Bernard Casoni as manager, Calvet was not called into the first team squad in 2013. He departed AJ Auxerre in September 2013.

Brentford
Calvet joined English League One club Brentford on transfer deadline day in September 2013 and signed a three-year contract for an undisclosed fee. He made his debut in a 2–1 Football League Trophy second round defeat to Peterborough United on 8 October and played the full 90 minutes. Under new first team manager Mark Warburton, Calvet received his maiden call into a league squad on 1 March 2014 and remained an unused substitute during a 0–0 draw with Carlisle United. Calvet finished the 2013–14 season with 15 appearances for the Development Squad and one first team appearance.

Calvet spent the entire 2014–15 Championship season out of first team contention and instead made 19 appearances for the Development Squad. Calvet was absent during Brentford's entire 2015–16 pre-season and joined Sporting Gijón B on trial in August 2015, but failed to win a contract. He departed Griffin Park on 3 November 2015, after having made just one appearance in just over two years with the Bees.

Return to Auxerre
Calvet rejoined AJ Auxerre in a non-professional status in January 2016. After recovering his fitness, he made two appearances for the B team in what remained of the 2015–16 season.

Annecy
On 27 September 2016, Calvet joined Championnat de France Amateur club Annecy on a two-year contract. He scored the first senior goal of his career on his eighth appearance, in a 3–1 victory over Le Puy Foot 43 Auvergne. He finished the 2016–17 season with 18 appearances, three goals and signed a new two-year contract in May 2017. Calvet made 27 appearances and scored one goal during the 2017–18 season, which culminated in a second-place finish behind the promoted team, Villefranche. He departed the club in July 2018, after making 45 appearances and scoring two goals during two seasons at the Parc des Sports.

Le Mans
On 4 July 2018, it was announced that Calvet had joined newly-promoted Championnat National club Le Mans on a one-year contract. He made just 14 appearances and departed by mutual consent at the end of the 2018–19 season.

Sedan
In July 2019, Calvet joined Championnat National 2 club Sedan on a free transfer and made 21 appearances during the truncated 2019–20 season. As a result of the 2020–21 season being declared null and void in April 2021, Calvet finished the season with 13 appearances. He was retained for the 2021–22 season and captained the club to a top-half finish. Despite being offered a new contract in December 2021, Calvet opted to allow his contract to expire. During three seasons with Sedan, he made 63 appearances.

Martigues
On 12 July 2022, Calvet transferred to Championnat National club Martigues.

International career
Calvet captained the France U16, U17 and U18 squads and played in the 2011 European U17 Championship and the 2011 U17 World Cup. He received his first call up to the France U20 squad for the 2013 Jeux de la Francophonie and made his debut in a 3–0 group stage defeat to Congo. He went on to win three further U20 caps.

Career statistics

References

External links
 
 
 
 
 
 

1994 births
Living people
French footballers
Association football defenders
AJ Auxerre players
Brentford F.C. players
FC Annecy players
Le Mans FC players
CS Sedan Ardennes players
FC Martigues players
Ligue 2 players
Championnat National players
Championnat National 2 players
French expatriate footballers
Expatriate footballers in England
France youth international footballers
French expatriate sportspeople in England
Sportspeople from Auxerre
Footballers from Bourgogne-Franche-Comté